Jaykrishnapur is a census town in PURBA BURDHAMAN district, West Bengal, India
Joykrishnapur is a village in PURBA BURDHAMAN is district, West Bengal, India

It also refers to:
Jaykrishnapur, Murshidabad, a census town in PURBA BURDHAMAN district, West Bengal, India